Mastrinka  is a village on the island of Čiovo in Croatia. It is connected by the D126 highway.

Populated places in Split-Dalmatia County
Populated coastal places in Croatia